This is a list of yearly South Dakota Intercollegiate Conference football standings.

South Dakota Intercollegiate Conference football standings

Pre-NAIA

References

Standings